Astro Shuang Xing is a 24-hour Mandarin youth entertainment TV channel owned and run by pay TV provider, Astro. The channel provides variety entertainment that target for younger generation.

History and programming
Astro Shuang Xing officially opened on 29 September 2003,  broadcasting two channels, i.e., Shuang Xing 1 and Shuang Xing 2 (channel 37 and 38, respectively). On New Year's Day 2004 at midnight stroke, the first channel was discontinued and only channel 38 was retained, merging the two channels to a single channel. In October 2007, with the channel renumbering, Astro Shuang Xing moved to channel 324 (until 31 March 2020, starting 1 April 2020, its channel number was changed to 347). Its programming genres cover from epic to idol, action, costume, comedy and romance. Its unique scheduling pattern enables viewers to catch up on the last episode first before broadcasting the new episode.

Astro Shuang Xing HD was launched on 16 November 2014 and is the simulcast HD version of it On Channel 307. Malay and Chinese subtitles are available for all dramas (excluding Singaporean dramas which does not have Chinese subtitles). However, English subtitles is only available for Cantonese (between 19 November 2014 to 23 September 2015) and Japanese dramas.

Since 9 July 2018, the channel started showing more dramas from China while Singaporean dramas moved to its sister channel, Astro AEC, Meanwhile, Astro Shuang Xing was broadcasting rerun dramas and new released dramas from China and Taiwan.

External links 
 Official Website of Astro Shuang Xing

Astro Malaysia Holdings television channels
Television channels and stations established in 2003